Bonatea  is a genus of orchids native to tropical and southern Africa, with one species extending into Yemen and Saudi Arabia.

Species currently recognized as of May 2014:

Bonatea antennifera Rolfe - South Africa, Mozambique, Botswana, Zimbabwe
Bonatea boltonii (Harv.) Bolus - South Africa
Bonatea cassidea Sond. - South Africa, Eswatini, Zimbabwe
Bonatea lamprophylla J.Stewart - Mozambique, KwaZulu-Natal
Bonatea polypodantha (Rchb.f.) L.Bolus - South Africa
Bonatea porrecta (Bolus) Summerh. - South Africa, Mozambique, Botswana, Eswatini
Bonatea pulchella Summerh. - Mozambique, KwaZulu-Natal, Transvaal
Bonatea rabaiensis (Rendle) Rolfe in D.Oliver - Kenya, Tanzania
Bonatea saundersioides (Kraenzl. & Schltr.) Cortesi - Mpumalanga, KwaZulu-Natal, Eswatini
Bonatea speciosa (L.f.) Willd.  - South Africa, Mozambique
Bonatea stereophylla (Kraenzl.) Summerh. - Tanzania
Bonatea steudneri (Rchb.f.) T.Durand & Schinz - from South Africa to Saudi Arabia, including Democratic Republic of the Congo, Tanzania, Angola, Mozambique, Sudan, Ethiopia, etc.
Bonatea volkensiana (Kraenzl.) Rolfe in D.Oliver - Kenya, Tanzania

References

External links 

Orchideae
Orchids of Africa
Flora of Yemen
Flora of Saudi Arabia
Orchideae genera